Saldoida is a genus of shore bugs in the family Saldidae. There are about five described species in Saldoida.

Species
These five species belong to the genus Saldoida:
 Saldoida armata Horváth, 1911
 Saldoida cornuta Osborn, 1901
 Saldoida schmitzi Cobben, 1987
 Saldoida slossonae Osborn, 1901
 Saldoida turbaria Schuh, 1967

References

Further reading

 
 

Articles created by Qbugbot
Heteroptera genera
Saldoidini